XHRRR-FM may refer to:

XHRRR-FM (Jalisco) in Encarnación de Díaz, 89.5 RRR FM
XHRRR-FM (Veracruz) in Papantla de Olarte, La Huasteca 89.3 FM